Datuk Wira Mohd Hatta bin Md. Ramli (Jawi: محمد حتّى بن مد رملي; born 11 September 1956) is a Malaysian politician who served as the Deputy Minister of Entrepreneur Development in the Pakatan Harapan (PH) administration under former Prime Minister Mahathir Mohamad and former Minister Mohd Redzuan Md Yusof from July 2018 to the collapse of the PH administration in February 2020. He has served as the Member of Parliament (MP) for Lumut since May 2018 and Kuala Krai from March 2008 to May 2018. He is a member and Secretary-General of the National Trust Party (AMANAH), a component party of PH opposition coalition and was a member, Treasurer, Elections Director and Central Committee Member of the Malaysian Islamic Party (PAS), a former component party of the former Pakatan Rakyat (PR) opposition coalition. He was a member of the Gerakan Harapan Baru (GHB), the group of PAS progressive Islamists leaders who have lost in the 2015 PAS party election, they later founded a new party, namely AMANAH.

Election results

Honours
  :
  Knight Commander of the Order of Malacca (DCSM) - Datuk Wira (2018)

References

External links
 
 

Living people
1956 births
People from Perak
Malaysian people of Malay descent
Malaysian Muslims
Malaysian general practitioners
Former Malaysian Islamic Party politicians
National Trust Party (Malaysia) politicians
Members of the Dewan Rakyat
21st-century Malaysian politicians